Steeve-Mike Eboa Ebongue (born 20 February 2001), known as Steeve-Mike Eyango, is a French professional footballer of Cameroonian descent who plays as a midfielder for Italian  club Giugliano.

Career
Eboa Ebongue came through the Bordeaux youth system, before joining Genoa on 2 September 2019. He made his Serie A debut on 19 October 2020 in a 0–0 draw against Hellas Verona.

On 31 August 2021, he joined Cosenza on a season-long loan.

On 31 January 2022, the loan was terminated early. On the same day he went to Siena on loan.

On 3 September 2022, Steeve-Mike signed with Rimini.

On 11 January 2023, Steeve-Mike moved to Giugliano, also in Serie C.

Career statistics

References

2001 births
Black French sportspeople
Living people
French sportspeople of Cameroonian descent
French footballers
Association football midfielders
Serie A players
Serie B players
Serie C players
Genoa C.F.C. players
Cosenza Calcio players
A.C.N. Siena 1904 players
Rimini F.C. 1912 players
S.S.C. Giugliano players
French expatriate footballers
French expatriate sportspeople in Italy
Expatriate footballers in Italy